Uratman is a somma volcano located at the northern end of Simushir Island, Kuril Islands, Russia. It overlooks the Brouton Bay which is contained within the crater. The volcano consists of a Pleistocene caldera which contains an andesite cone of Holocene age.

See also
 List of volcanoes in Russia

References 

Simushir
Volcanoes of the Kuril Islands
Holocene volcanoes
Holocene Asia